The following is a table of the Statistics of the 1992–93 Saudi First Division, the second-tier league of football in Saudi Arabia.

External links 
 Saudi Arabia Football Federation
 Saudi League Statistics
 Al Jazirah 25 April 1993 issue 7514 

Saudi First Division League seasons
Saudi Professional League
2